The Kree are a fictional species in Marvel Comics.

Kree may also refer to:

Kree Woods, American singer-songwriter
Kree Harrison, American singer, American Idol contestant
Martin Kree, German footballer
KREE (FM), a radio station (88.1 FM) licensed to serve Pirtleville, Arizona, United States

See also 
 Cree (disambiguation)